Brynton Lemar (born January 23, 1995) is an American-born Jamaican professional basketball player for AEK Athens of the Greek Basket League and the BCL. After playing four years of college basketball at UC Davis, Lemarentered the 2017 NBA draft, but he was not selected in the draft's two rounds.

High school career
During high school, Lemar attended St. Augustine High School, in San Diego, California. In his last season at Body of Christ, he averaged 21 points, 8.2 rebounds and 7.0 assists per game.

College career 
After high school, Lemar played college basketball at UC Davis, from 2013 to 2017. In his senior year at UC Davis, Lemar averaged 16.1 points and 3.3 rebounds per game. He was also mentioned to the Big West All-First Team.

Professional career
After failing to be drafted in the 2017 NBA draft, Lemar signed with SLUC Nancy of the LNB Pro B. He finished the season with Caen.

On February 14, 2021, he joined Reggiana of the LBA.

On August 2, 2021, he joined Enisey of the VTB United League. He left the team and joined Le Mans of the Pro A.

On February 23, 2023, Lemar joined AEK Athens, of the Greek Basket League, replacing Cameron McGriff on the team's squad.

References

External links 
 UC Davis Aggies  College Profile
 Brynton Lemar at esake.gr 
 Brynton Lemar at legabasket.it

1995 births
Living people
AEK B.C. players
American men's basketball players
Lega Basket Serie A players
Point guards
American expatriate basketball people in France
American expatriate basketball people in Hungary
American expatriate basketball people in Turkey
American expatriate basketball people in Greece
American expatriate basketball people in Russia
American expatriate basketball people in Italy
American expatriate basketball people in Poland
Shooting guards